The men's shot put event  at the 1977 European Athletics Indoor Championships was held on 13 March in San Sebastián.

Results

References

Shot put at the European Athletics Indoor Championships
Shot